"Somethin' Stupid", or "Something Stupid", is a song written by C. Carson Parks. It was originally recorded in 1966 by Parks and his wife Gaile Foote, as Carson and Gaile.  A 1967 version by Frank Sinatra and his daughter Nancy Sinatra became a major international hit, reaching number one on both the Billboard Hot 100 chart and the UK Singles Chart. In 2001, a cover version by British vocalist Robbie Williams and Australian actress Nicole Kidman reached number one in the UK Singles Chart.

Carson and Gaile version
In the early 1960s, Carson Parks was a folk singer in Los Angeles. He was an occasional member of The Easy Riders, and also performed with The Steeltown Three, which included his younger brother Van Dyke Parks. In 1963, he formed the Greenwood County Singers, later known as The Greenwoods, who had two minor hits and included singer Gaile Foote.  Before the Greenwoods disbanded, Parks and Foote married and, as Carson and Gaile, recorded an album in 1966 for Kapp Records, San Antonio Rose, which included the song "Something Stupid".  The recording was then brought to the attention of Frank Sinatra.

Frank and Nancy Sinatra version

The most successful and best-known version of "Somethin' Stupid" was issued in 1967 as a single by Nancy Sinatra and Frank Sinatra and subsequently appeared on Frank's album The World We Knew. Frank had played Parks' recording to his daughter's producer, Lee Hazlewood, who recalled, "He asked me, 'Do you like it?' and I said, 'I love it, and if you don't sing it with Nancy, I will.' He said, 'We're gonna do it, book a studio. Their rendition was recorded on February 1, 1967, after Frank had finished his collaboration with Antonio Carlos Jobim earlier in the day. Al Casey played guitar on the recording and Hal Blaine was the drummer. Hazlewood and Jimmy Bowen were listed as the producers of the single, with arrangement by Billy Strange.

The single spent four weeks at number 1 on the US Billboard Hot 100 chart and nine weeks atop the easy listening (now adult contemporary) chart, becoming Frank's second gold single as certified by the RIAA and Nancy's third. In Norway the single qualified for silver disc. It was the first and only instance of a father-daughter number-one song in America. Nancy Sinatra was quoted as sarcastically saying, "Some people call (Something Stupid) the Incest Song, which I think is, well, very sweet!" . The single also reached number 1 on the UK Singles Chart the same year. It was also nominated for the Record Of The Year at the 10th Grammy Awards, losing to the 5th Dimension's upbeat hit song "Up, Up And Away".

Usage in popular culture
In episode 21 of the third season of The Simpsons, Sideshow Bob and Selma Bouvier (voiced by Kelsey Grammer and Julie Kavner, respectively) perform the Frank and Nancy Sinatra version as a karaoke.

In the Breaking Bad spin-off series Better Call Saul, episode seven of season four is titled after the song, with the opening montage containing an original rendition performed by Lola Marsh.  The song is again used in a montage in episode nine of season five.

In the Channel 4 series Peep Show series 1, episode 2, the Peters and Lee version of the song is quoted in dialogue and plays during the closing credits.

In the movie Joy (2015 film), in a flashback scene, Jennifer Lawrence's title character sings the duet with her soon-to-be husband played by Édgar Ramírez. 

In the 2022 Holiday Special episode of Call the Midwife, Matthew and Nancy lip-sync to the Sinatra recording of the song, as part of a community talent show.  The episode was set in December 1967.

Personnel

Vocalists
 Frank Sinatra – vocals
 Nancy Sinatra – vocals

Leaders
 Claus Ogerman – conductor
 Billy Strange – arranger, conductor

Instrumentalists
 Hal Blaine – drums
 Glen Campbell – guitar
 Alvin Casey – guitar
 Roy Caton – trumpet
 Victor Feldman – percussion
 Carol Kaye – electric bass
 Bill Miller – piano
 Oliver Mitchell – trumpet
 Donald Owens – piano
 Ralph Peña – string bass

Charts

Weekly charts

Year-end charts

Certifications

Ali Campbell and Kibibi Campbell version

In 1995, Ali Campbell and his then 7-year-old  daughter Kibibi Campbell covered the hit as a duet. As a suggestion to the version of Frank Sinatra and Nancy Sinatra was used, based on this part of the Musikrichting was adapted in the cover. After its release on the studio album Big Love, it can also be found on the compilation Silhouette.

Music video
The music video was shot in New York City. Ali Campbell and his daughter spend an afternoon in the city. They relax on the bench in the park, also walk through the city center, look through a sightseeing telescope, watch jugglers and fire breathers in a circus, figure skaters and stroll.

Charts

Robbie Williams and Nicole Kidman version

British singer Robbie Williams recorded a cover version of "Somethin' Stupid" as a duet with Australian actress Nicole Kidman. The song appeared on Williams' 2001 album, Swing When You're Winning, and was released as the album's lead single on December 10, 2001, topping the UK Singles Chart at the end of the year. The song was Christmas number one in the United Kingdom, and Williams' fifth number one overall. The single sold 400,000 copies to earn a gold certification from the British Phonographic Industry. The accompanying music video was directed by Vaughan Arnell.

The song was the 30th-best-selling single of 2001 in the UK. It also gave Williams another number-one hit in New Zealand, earning a gold certification, and charted inside the top 10 in several European countries. In Australia, it became Williams' fourth top-10 single, earning a gold certification for over 35,000 copies sold.

Track listings
UK and Australian CD single
 "Somethin' Stupid" – 2:51
 "Eternity" (orchestral version) – 5:32
 "My Way" (live at the Albert Hall) – 7:00
 "Somethin' Stupid" (video)

UK cassette single
 "Somethin' Stupid" – 2:51
 "Eternity" (orchestral version) – 5:32
 "My Way" (live at the Albert Hall) – 7:00

UK DVD single
 "Somethin' Stupid" (video) – 3:08
 "Let's Face the Music and Dance" (audio) – 2:36
 "That's Life" (audio) – 3:07

European CD single
 "Somethin' Stupid" – 2:51
 "My Way" (live at the Albert Hall) – 7:00

Credits and personnel
Credits are taken from the Swing When You're Winning album booklet.

Studios
 Recorded at various studios
 Mixed at Capitol Recording Studios (Los Angeles) and Air Lyndhurst Studios (London, England)
 Mastered at The Mastering Lab (Los Angeles) and Metropolis Mastering (London, England)

Personnel

 C. Carson Parks – writing
 Robbie Williams – vocals
 Nicole Kidman – vocals
 Mitch Dalton – guitars
 Dave Catlin-Birch – bass
 Ralph Salmins – drums
 Frank Ricotti – percussion
 Steve Sidwell – trumpet, arrangement, conducting
 Simon Gardner – trumpet
 Paul Spong – trumpet
 London Session Orchestra – orchestra
 Gavyn Wright – concertmaster
 Guy Chambers – production
 Steve Power – production
 Al Schmitt – vocal recording
 Charlie Paakkari – assistant engineering
 Steve Genewick – assistant engineering
 Steve Price – assistant engineering
 Rupert Coulson – assistant mix engineering
 Ricky Graham – assistant mix engineering
 Mike Ross-Trevor – orchestral engineering
 Richard Flack – Pro Tools
 Doug Sax – mastering (The Mastering Lab)
 Tony Cousins – mastering (Metropolis)

Charts

Weekly charts

Year-end charts

Certifications

Release history

References

External links
 

1967 singles
1995 singles
2001 singles
Frank Sinatra songs
Nancy Sinatra songs
Andy Williams songs
Robbie Williams songs
Nicole Kidman songs
European Hot 100 Singles number-one singles
Irish Singles Chart number-one singles
Number-one singles in Australia
Number-one singles in Italy
Number-one singles in Norway
Number-one singles in Poland
Number-one singles in Portugal
RPM Top Singles number-one singles
Number-one singles in South Africa
UK Singles Chart number-one singles
Billboard Hot 100 number-one singles
Cashbox number-one singles
Male–female vocal duets
Pop ballads
1966 songs
Reprise Records singles
Chrysalis Records singles
Music videos directed by Vaughan Arnell
Number-one singles in Scotland
Christmas number-one singles in the United Kingdom
Songs written by Carson Parks
1960s ballads
Jazz ballads